Birger Malmsten (23 December 1920 – 15 February 1991) was a Swedish actor. He had many roles in Ingmar Bergman's films.

Selected filmography 

 South of the Highway (1936) – Student (uncredited)
  (1940) – Staff Member (uncredited)
 General von Döbeln (1942) – Lieutenant at Svea Livgarde (uncredited)
 Ombyte av tåg (1943) – Young Man at the Café (uncredited)
 Life and Death (1943) – Telephone Operator (uncredited)
 Count Only the Happy Moments (1944) – Helge Wikström
 Torment (1944) – Kreutz – Student (uncredited)
 We Need Each Other (1944) – Guest at Café
 The Serious Game (1945) – Kaj Lidner (uncredited)
 It Rains on Our Love (1946) – David
 When the Meadows Blossom (1946) – Gunnar Hellman
 A Ship to India (1947) – Johannes Blom
 Crime in the Sun (1947) – Harry
 Music in Darkness (1948) – Bengt Vyldeke
 Banketten (1948) – Rex
 Eva (1948) – Bo
 Dangerous Spring (1949) – Torsten Hertgren
 Prison (1949) – Thomas
 Thirst (1949) – Bertil
 To Joy (1950) – Marcel
 Restaurant Intim (1950) – Alf Lindholm
  (1950) – Ivan Jansson
 Summer Interlude (1951) – Henrik
 Secrets of Women (1952) – Martin Lobelius
 Ursula, the Girl from the Finnish Forests (1953) – Hans Halvarsson
 All the World's Delights (1953) – Mats Eliasson
 No Man's Woman (1953) – Erland Klemensson
 Dance in the Smoke (1954) – Man in haystack (uncredited)
 Time of Desire (1954) – Algot Wiberg
 Gabrielle (1954) – Bertil Lindström
 The Unicorn (1955) – Christer Allard
 People of the Finnish Forests (1955) – David Amberg
 Moon Over Hellesta (1956) – Carl Anckarberg
  (1957) – Peter Kallander
 Encounters in the Twilight (1957) – Olle Lindberg
 Night Light (1957) – Mikael Sjöberg
 Playing on the Rainbow (1958) – Hasse Eriksson
 Laila (1958) – Mellet Omma
  (1959) – Jimmy Wilson
  (1959) – Paul Forsman
 The Silence (1963) – The Bartender
 Masculin Féminin (1966) – Lui (l'homme dans le film)
 Carmilla (1968) – Doctor Per Ek
  (1968) – Morbror
 Ann and Eve (1970) – Amos Mathews
 The Last Adventure (1974) – Company Commander
 Face to Face (1976) – Rapist
 Tabu (1977) – Publisher
 Jönssonligan får guldfeber (1984) – Öb

References

External links 
 

1920 births
1991 deaths
20th-century Swedish male actors
People from Östhammar Municipality